LaBarque Creek is an unincorporated community and census-designated place (CDP) in Jefferson County, Missouri, United States. Its population was 1,558 as of the 2010 census.

Geography
The community is in northwestern Jefferson County and is named for LaBarque Creek, a tributary of the Meramec River.

Demographics

References

Unincorporated communities in Jefferson County, Missouri
Unincorporated communities in Missouri
Census-designated places in Jefferson County, Missouri
Census-designated places in Missouri